Irina Shilova (born 1967 in Grodno) is a Belarusian sports shooter and Olympic champion. She won gold medal for the Soviet Union in the 10 metre air rifle at the 1988 Summer Olympics in Seoul. She has later competed for Belarus, and placed 9th in the 1996 Summer Olympics.

References

1967 births
Soviet female sport shooters
Belarusian female sport shooters
Shooters at the 1988 Summer Olympics
Shooters at the 1992 Summer Olympics
Shooters at the 1996 Summer Olympics
Shooters at the 2000 Summer Olympics
Olympic shooters of Belarus
Olympic gold medalists for the Soviet Union
Olympic shooters of the Soviet Union
Olympic shooters of the Unified Team
Living people
Olympic medalists in shooting
Honoured Masters of Sport of the USSR
Sportspeople from Grodno
Medalists at the 1988 Summer Olympics